Dodcott cum Wilkesley is a civil parish in the unitary authority of Cheshire East and the ceremonial county of Cheshire, England. The hamlet of Wilkesley (at ) lies 2½ miles to the west of Audlem and 7 miles to the south west of Nantwich. The parish also includes the village of Burleydam, the largest settlement, as well as the small settlements of Butterley Heyes, Cheshire Fields, Combermere, Lightwood Green and Royal's Green. It also formerly contained the settlements of Pinsley Green and Smeaton Wood, now located in Wrenbury cum Frith civil parish. Nearby villages include Adderley and Calverhall in Shropshire and Audlem, Newhall and Wrenbury within Cheshire.

According to the 2001 census, the parish had a population of 380, increasing to 415 at the 2011 Census.

Governance

From 1974 the civil parish was served by Crewe and Nantwich Borough Council, which was succeeded on 1 April 2009 by the new unitary authority of Cheshire East.  Dodcott cum Wilkesley falls in the parliamentary constituency of Eddisbury, which has been represented by Edward Timpson since 2019, after being represented by Stephen O'Brien (1999–2015) and Antoinette Sandbach (2015–19).

Geography and transport

The park of Combermere Abbey forms much of the area of the civil parish. Outside the park, there are several areas of woodland within the civil parish including Kent's Rough, Walkmill Covert and Wilkesley Covert.

The A525 and A530 roads run east–west and north–south, respectively, through the civil parish.

Combermere Abbey

Combermere Abbey is a former Cistercian monastery which was founded in 1133 and is listed at grade I. Its park includes the large lake of Comber Mere and several areas of mixed woodland, including Poole's Riding Wood.

Places of worship

St Mary and St Michael's Church is located in the village of Burleydam. It dates from 1769 and is listed at grade II.

Notable residents
Geoffrey Whitney (c. 1548 – c. 1601), a poet known for his collection Choice of Emblemes, lived at Royals Green towards the end of his life.

See also

Listed buildings in Dodcott cum Wilkesley

References

External links

Civil parishes in Cheshire
Villages in Cheshire